Tropidophlebia is a genus of true bugs belonging to the family Oxycarenidae.

The species of this genus are found in Europe.

Species:
 Tropidophlebia costalis (Herrich-Schaeffer, 1850) 
 Tropidophlebia subcarinata Muminov, 1973

References

Oxycarenidae
Hemiptera genera